Santo Stefano dei Cavalieri  is a church in central Pisa located on Piazza dei Cavalieri (Knight's Square).

Construction began on 17 April 1565 in order to build a church for the Order of Knights of St Stephan, founded by the Grand Duke Cosimo de' Medici to fight Saracen piracy in the Mediterranean.  The project with designs and oversight by Giorgio Vasari and David Fortini was to build a church on the site of an older church called San Sebastiano alle Fabbriche Maggiori, which dated at least to 1074. The new church on the site was consecrated by 21 December 1569.  The facade, in white marble was designed by Don Giovanni de' Medici, illegitimate son of Cosimo I, with the help of Alessandro Pieroni; their designs were chosen over Vasari’s original plan. An inscription commemorates completion during the reign of Ferdinando I de' Medici.

The bell-tower, also designed by Vasari, was completed by 1572 by Giovanni Fancelli. The main altar designs were by Pier Francesco Silvani. Many alterations and additions were proposed and made over the next two centuries, including plans by  Gherardo Mechini, Paolo Guidotti,  Ranieri Gherardi, Torpè Donati, Alessandro Gherardesca, Florido Galli, Niccolò Matas, and Pasquale Poccianti. The final reconstruction in 1859, completed after the suppression of the order, creates the clearer interior systematization of columns we see today.

Interior

The church display numerous trophy banners, captured during naval encounters with Saracen pirates. The font for holy water (1568) was sculpted by Giovanni Fancelli, based on designs by Vasari.

In the counterfacade are five monochrome paintings of Stories of St Stefano Pope and Martyr, including one celebrating the entrance of Ferdinando I on 31 March 1588. This grand-duke was to commission the wooden ceiling by Bartolomeo Atticciati (1604).

The Ceiling has six paintings on wood depicting episodes historic events in which the military order was active, including the Granting of uniforms by Cosimo I de' Medici by il Cigoli, the Return of the Fleet from the Battle of Lepanto and Sacking of Prevesa by Jacopo Ligozzi, The embarcation at Livorno of Maria de' Medici by Allori, Victory in the Greek Archipelago and Capture of Bona by l'Empoli,

The polychrome pulpit (1627) was completed by Chiarissimo Fancelli. It contains paintings by the Pisan Aurelio Lomi of Madonna and child with Saints Joseph and Stefano (1593) and a painting of the palace of the Order.

The Main altar (1702–1709) in the presbytery was designed and sculpted by  Giovanni Battista Foggini with a statue of St Stefano Pope and  allegorical figures of Religion and Faith, and on the bronze throne, a relief with the Decapitation of St Stefano.
At the right is a painting by Giorgio Vasari, with the Entombment of St Stefano (1571), while at the right is a Birth of Christ (1564)  by  Bronzino.

In the Sacristy is a sculptural group by Foggini of St Stefano and the allegory of Reason and the Trinity (1683), made in occasion of the translation of the body of the saint to this church in 1682.

The chapel of the Holy Sacrament was completed in 1837 by Florido Galli.

Organ
There are three organs in the church, the first from 1571 by the Cortonese organ-maker  Onofrio Zeffirini.  On the left is an organ by the Sienese Azzolino Bernardino della Ciaja reconstructed in 1733. In 1931, Giovanni Tamburini builds a new organ behind the 1733 organ. The modern organ is the only functioning one in the church.

See also

Notes

Stefano dei Cavalieri
Roman Catholic churches completed in 1569
Renaissance architecture in Pisa
1569 establishments in the Grand Duchy of Tuscany
16th-century Roman Catholic church buildings in Italy
Giorgio Vasari buildings